Apia is the capital of Samoa.

Apia or APIA may also refer to:

Places
 Apía, Risaralda, a town in Colombia
 Apia, city in Greek mythology which was ruled by Apis

Other uses
 Apia Muri, Papua New Guinean basketball player
 APIA Leichhardt FC, an Australian football (soccer) club
 Adaptive participatory integrated approach, a method of managing water irrigation
 Australian Pensioners Insurance Agency, a subsidiary of the Promina Group insurance company